Jenny Lönnkvist (born March 28, 1989) is a Swedish orienteering competitor, and junior world champion.

Junior career 
Lönnkvist became Junior World Champion in the middle distance in Dubbo in 2007, and received a silver medal in relay. She received a bronze medal in sprint at the 2008 Junior World Championships in Göteborg.

She became Swedish junior champion in night orienteering in 2007, and again in 2008.

Senior career 
Lönnkvist participated at the 2009 World Orienteering Championships in Hungary, where she qualified for the middle distance final.

Personal life 
Lönnkvist is daughter of Lars Lönnkvist and Barbro Lönnkvist, both international orienteers.

References

External links
 

1989 births
Living people
Swedish orienteers
Female orienteers
Foot orienteers
Junior World Orienteering Championships medalists